Euphaedra christyi is a butterfly in the family Nymphalidae. It is found in Uganda, from the western part of the country to the Kalizu, Kibule and Kayonza forests.

References

Butterflies described in 1904
christyi
Endemic fauna of Uganda
Butterflies of Africa